John Beswicke (1847–1925) was an architect who practiced in Melbourne between the 1870s and 1915.

A prolific and successful designer, he is known to have designed some 300 buildings, including 203 houses, 9 banks, 14 churches, 44 commercial buildings, 11 hotels, 15 institutional buildings such as hospitals, 45 shops and 6 large town halls.

History 

John Beswicke was the son of Charles Beswicke and Elizabeth Keys, who had both arrived in the Port Phillip district in the 1840s.  In 1847 Charles married Elizabeth when he was aged 40 and Elizabeth was 18. They had 3 daughters and 2 sons, John being their second son. John went to Geelong Grammar School and in 1862 was apprenticed to the firm Crouch & Wilson at age 16, where he continued to work for 18 years, finishing as head assistant. While there he worked on such prominent projects as the Deaf School and Blind Institute, both built in the 1860s on St Kilda Road, the main building for MLC in Hawthorn in 1882, and numerous churches, as well as some of his own projects. The practice of Crouch & Wilson passed to the sons of the principals in 1881, when Crouch retired, and Ralph Wilson left to join with Bewicke to create Wilson & Beswicke on 2 January 1882, until Wilson's death in 1889. After this he was often in sole practice as J. Beswicke, but also in other partnerships including Beswicke & Hutchins (1889–90), and Beswicke & Coote (1890–93).

Amongst his prolific output was a series of grand houses in Harcourt Street in Hawthorn,  many for his family, from the 1870s to 1900; of 15 buildings built in this area, 14 are still standing. His father Charles had bought land in Harcourt Street in 1873 and moved from Geelong into a house at No 5, which John designed while he was still at Crouch & Wilson (‘Les Avents’, later ‘Carn Brae’, altered in the 1920s). John Beswicke's own residence ‘Rotha’ at No 29 was built in 1887, and in 1900 he built the even grander ‘Talana’ on the corner of Auburn Road for his wife, but she preferred to stay at ‘Rotha’.

Beswicke was associated as a consulting designer with a number of property and building companies in the Boom period of the 1880s. One of these was the Australian Property and Investment Co; he had designed houses and subdivisions for one of the directors, and his brother in law had been a manager. He was invited to a limited competition called in 1888 by the company to design a 12 storey office building on the corner of Elizabeth Street and Flinders Lane, which was won Henry Hardie Kemp, who soon took on partners to become Oakden, Addison and Kemp. Beswicke was included in the project as he had studied tall buildings, and probably provided technical advice, while the Queen Anne style of what became known as the Australian Building (aka APA Building) was Kemp's. The remarkable structure was amongst the worlds tallest at the time, and it remained Melbourne's tallest until the 1920s, and was demolished in 1980.

He designed a number of notable shop/ office/ residence blocks in a distinctive eclectic style that included polychrome brickwork with cement render classical details over three storeys; there are two such blocks in Auburn Village in Hawthorn, on Auburn Road, near Burwood Road, and a larger one on Brunswick Street, Fitzroy. that is now named after the architect as the Beswicke Building.

Some of his houses feature distinctive corner turrets with 'candle snuffer' roofs, his own house Rotha sports the first example, with square ones on the three houses at 5, 7, 9 Yarra Street, Hawthorn, with later examples on Redholme (Warwillah) and Talana. Another distinctive feature is the use of decorative gables on each face of a polygonal bay window, also seen on his own house Rotha, on Derriweit Heights, and in simpler versions on single storey houses.

Notable works

Town Halls:
 Brighton Town Hall, 1885
Malvern Town Hall, 1886, Wilson & Beswicke
Essendon Town Hall, 1886, Wilson & Beswicke
 Dandenong Town Hall, 1890, Beswicke & Hutchins
 Hawthorn Town Hall, 1888

Churches:
 Keysborough Uniting (formerly Methodist) Uniting Church, Chapel Rd, Keysborough, 1877,

 St. Kilda Presbyterian, Barkly Street and Alma Road, St. Kilda, 1883

Commercial:
 Two sets of three storey shops, Auburn Road, Auburn Village
 Beswicke Buildings, three storey shops and residences, 236-252 Brunswick Street, Fitzroy

Domestic:
 ‘Les Avents’ (‘Carn Brae’, altered in the 1920s), 5 Harcourt Street, Hawthorn 1873
'Tudor Lodge'(later Hilton House), 13 Harcourt Street, Hawthorn, 1873
'Lexinton' (later Murtoa), 7 Harcourt Street, Hawthorn, 1878
'Bendigonia', 25 Queens Road, Melbourne, 1882, Wilson & Beswicke
'Tudor House', cnr. Pasco and Electra streets, Williamstown, 1884, Wilson & Beswicke
'Rotha', (Beswicke's own home), 29 Harcourt Street, Hawthorn, 1887
'Miharo', 145 Noble Street, Newtown, Geelong, 1890, Beswicke & Coote
'Cullymont' & 'Eyre Court', 4 Selwyn Street, Canterbury, 1890
5, 7 & 9 Yarra Street, Hawthorn, 1890
'Westella', 39 Kinkora Road, Hawtorn, 1891, Beswicke & Coote
'Tourmont' (now Fintona Girls School), 79 Balwyn Road, Balwyn, 1891
'Derriweit Heights', Douglas Road. Mount Macedon, 1893 (additional floor). Destroyed in 1983 Ash Wednesday fires.
'Karawu', 405 Tooronga Road, Hawthorn, 1895, Beswicke and Coote  
'Redholme' (later Warwillah), 572 St Kilda Road, Melbourne, 1896
'Talana', 1 Harcourt Street, Hawthorn, 1900

References

External links
References to John Beswicke, National Library of Australia
Victorian Heritage Register
C57 - Auburn Village Heritage Precinct
Tudor House (1884)
John Beswicke 1847 -1925 Heritage Architect, Ken Bethell 2012

Victorian (Australia) architects
1847 births
1925 deaths